Intelligent Transit (iT) was a joint venture bus service of the Tri-State Transit Authority and the Kanawha Valley Regional Transportation Authority system, which operated a twice per day bus link between downtown Huntington, West Virginia and downtown  Charleston, West Virginia, with stops at the Marshall University main campus, the Teays Valley suburbs, and at the West Virginia State Capitol Building.  Due to expired grants, declining gas prices, and reduced ridership, a decision was made to cease operation of the Intelligent Transit on August 28, 2015.

Park and Ride Lots
Huntington Mall (I-64 Exit 20B)
Milton (I-64 Exit 28)
Crooked Creek (I-64 Exit 40)

References

External links
 Home page

Charleston, West Virginia metropolitan area
Bus transportation in West Virginia